R28 may refer to:

Roads 
 R28 road (Ghana)
 R-28 regional road (Montenegro)
 R28 (South Africa)

Other uses 
 R28 (New York City Subway car)
 , a destroyer of the Royal Navy
 R28: Very toxic if swallowed, a risk phrase
 Renault R28, a Formula One racing car